Ecological systems theory (also called development in context or human ecology theory) was developed by Urie Bronfenbrenner. It offers a framework through which community psychologists examine individuals' relationships within communities and the wider society. The theory is also commonly referred to as the ecological/systems framework. It identifies five environmental systems with which an individual interacts.

The five systems 

 Microsystem: Refers to the institutions and groups that most immediately and directly impact the child's development including: family, school, religious institutions, neighborhood, and peers.
 Mesosystem:  Consists of interconnections between the microsystems, for example between the family and teachers or between the child’s peers and the family.
 Exosystem: Involves links between social settings that do not involve the child.  For example, a child's experience at home may be influenced by their parent's experiences at work.  A parent might receive a promotion that requires more travel, which in turn increases conflict with the other parent resulting in changes in their patterns of interaction with the child.
 Macrosystem:  Describes the overarching culture that influences the developing child, as well as the microsystems and mesosystems embedded in those cultures. Cultural contexts can differ based on geographic location, socioeconomic status, poverty, and ethnicity.  Members of a cultural group often share a common identity, heritage, and values. Macrosystems evolve across time and from generation to generation.
 Chronosystem:  Consists of the pattern of environmental events and transitions over the life course, as well as changing socio-historical circumstances.  For example, researchers have found that the negative effects of divorce on children often peak in the first year after the divorce.  By two years after the divorce, family interaction is less chaotic and more stable.  An example of changing sociohistorical circumstances is the increase in opportunities for women to pursue a career during the last thirty years.

Later work by Bronfenbrenner considered the role of biology in this model as well; thus the theory has sometimes been called the Bioecological model.

Per this theoretical construction, each system contains roles, norms and rules which may shape psychological development. For example, an inner-city family faces many challenges which an affluent family in a gated community does not, and vice versa. The inner-city family is more likely to experience environmental hardships, like crime and squalor. On the other hand, the sheltered family is more likely to lack the nurturing support of extended family.

Since its publication in 1979, Bronfenbrenner's major statement of this theory, The Ecology of Human Development  has had widespread influence on the way psychologists and others approach the study of human beings and their environments. As a result of his groundbreaking work in human ecology, these environments—from the family to economic and political structures—have come to be viewed as part of the life course from childhood through adulthood.

Bronfenbrenner has identified Soviet developmental psychologist Lev Vygotsky and German-born psychologist Kurt Lewin as important influences on his theory.

Bronfenbrenner's work provides one of the foundational elements of the ecological counseling perspective, as espoused by Robert K. Conyne, Ellen Cook, and the University of Cincinnati Counseling Program.

There are many different theories related to human development.  Human ecology theory emphasizes environmental factors as central to development.

See also
 Bioecological model
 Ecosystem
 Ecosystem ecology
 Systems ecology
 Systems psychology
 Theoretical ecology

References

The diagram of the ecosystemic model was created by Buehler (2000) as part of a dissertation on assessing interactions between a child, their family, and the school and medical systems.

Further reading
 Urie Bronfenbrenner. (2009). The Ecology of Human Development: Experiments by Nature and Design. Cambridge, Massachusetts: Harvard University Press. 
 Dede Paquette & John Ryan. (2001). Bronfenbrenner’s Ecological Systems Theory
 
 Marlowe E. Trance, Kerstin O. Flores. (2014). " Child and Adolescent Development" Vol. 32. no. 5 9407

Ecological Systems Review
The ecological framework facilitates organizing information about people and their environment in
order to understand their interconnectedness. Individuals move through a series of life transitions,
all of which necessitate environmental support and coping skills. Social problems involving
health care, family relations, inadequate income, mental health difficulties, conflicts with law
enforcement agencies, unemployment, educational difficulties, and so on can all be subsumed
under the ecological model, which would enable practitioners to assess factors that are relevant
to such problems (Hepworth, Rooney, Rooney, Strom-Gottfried, & Larsen, 2010, p. 16). Thus,
examining the ecological contexts of parenting success of children with disabilities is particularly
important. Utilizing Bronfenbrenner’s (1977, 1979) ecological framework, this article explores
parenting success factors at the micro- (i.e., parenting practice, parent-child relations), meso-
(i.e., caregivers’ marital relations, religious social support), and macro-system levels (i.e., cultural
variations, racial and ethnic disparities, and health care delivery system) of practice.

Developmental psychology

Systems psychology
Systems theory